"Moving On Up" is the seventh overall single from British band M People, and the second single from their second album, Elegant Slumming (1993). Written by band members Mike Pickering and Paul Heard, and produced by M People, it was released on 13 September 1993. The song peaked at number two on the UK Singles Chart and number one on the UK Dance Singles Chart and was the biggest selling M People single. It also became a top-40 hit on the US Billboard Hot 100 and number one on the Billboard Dance Club Songs chart. The accompanying music video sees the band performing in a club.

Artwork
On United Kingdom and European versions of the single, the cover appeared with two thirds of the cover featuring a side profile of lead singer Heather Small, looking serious to hint that she's moving away. The bottom third of the single has a purple banner all the way across with the title written on it. On other versions of the single, the colour of this banner was red, yellow or blue.

Chart performance
"Moving On Up" proved to be M People's biggest hit worldwide, peaking at number one on both the RPM Dance/Urban chart in Canada and the Billboard Dance Club Songs chart in the United States. In Europe, it entered the top 10 in Finland (6), France (3), Ireland (4) and the United Kingdom. In the latter, the single peaked at number two in its second week at the UK Singles Chart, on 26 September 1993. It was held off reaching the top spot by DJ Jazzy Jeff & The Fresh Prince's "Boom! Shake the Room". But on the UK Dance Singles Chart, it soared to the number one position. Additionally, "Moving On Up" was a top-20 hit in Austria (17), Belgium (17), Denmark (18), the Netherlands (11), Sweden (20) and Switzerland (19), as well as on the Eurochart Hot 100, where it reached number 12 in October 1993. Outside Europe, it also peaked at number three in Israel, number four in both Australia and New Zealand, number 23 on the RPM Top Singles chart in Canada, number 34 on the US Billboard Hot 100 and number 16 on the US Cash Box Top 100. 

The single earned a gold record in New Zealand (5,000), a silver record in the UK (200,000), and a platinum record in Australia (70,000).

Critical reception
Keith Farley from AllMusic described the song as a "nu-disco slant". Another editor, Jose F. Promis, declared it as "electrifying". Larry Flick from Billboard wrote that here, frontwoman Heather Small and the band "deftly blends state-of-the-charts club trends with a reverence for classic Motown and R&B sounds. After one spin, you'll be humming the chorus for a week, which is the mark of a true smash." Kendall Morgan from Dallas Morning News complimented it as "ear candy". Anderson Jones from Entertainment Weekly viewed it as a number "that has set disco balls spinning across Europe". Dave Sholin from the Gavin Report said that excitement about "this uptempo winner" is spreading fast and "one listen should explain why." Ben Thompson from The Independent called it "exceptionally feisty", adding that contemporary pop-soul does not get much better than this. Robert Hilburn from Los Angeles Times declared it as a "glorious dancefloor record – as spirited a declaration of independence (from a bad relationship) as Gloria Gaynor's "I Will Survive"." In his weekly UK chart commentary, James Masterton viewed it as "another piece of classic dance pop". Howard Cohen for The Miami Herald wrote, "The song's got a sassy hook, paired with a glossy fat beat and infectious melody. The song – an "I Will Survive" for the '90s – is the highlight of M People's Elegant Slumming". 

Pan-European magazine Music & Media concluded that "the '90s will be type-cast as the age of retro, both in rock and in dance. These people restore Funky Town as the capital of good old disco. A floor filler annex airplay hit is born!" Andy Beevers from Music Week gave the song five out of five and named it Pick of the Week in the category of Dance, complimenting it as "another dead catchy radio-friendly tune". A reviewer from The Network Forty called it a "perfect uptempo fun springtime" track. Newcastle Journal declared it as "one of the best releases of the year." Reading Evening Post described it as "funky". James Hamilton from the RM Dance Update viewed it as a "stunningly catchy "nothing can stop me" chanter". Tom Doyle from Smash Hits gave it four out of five, adding, "'One Night In Heaven' proved M People are the finest exponents of the party garage sound. "Moving On Up" is in much the same vein, except it's better, being a proper happy happy disco record." Jonathan Bernstein from Spin complimented Small's "smoky" alto on the "anthemic hit-the-road brio" of the song. Steve Pick from St. Louis Post-Dispatch commented, "You can hear a straight line from the Stereo MC's "Connected" to this, a deep, in-the-pocket groove featuring a jazzy, funky break in the middle and, of course, subtle tenor saxophone honks. The big difference, aside from the fact that this one isn't quite as catchy, is the presence of a big-voiced disco diva whose alto tones conjure up dim memories of Donna Summer, especially on the soaring, nearly exuberant chorus."

Music video
A music video was produced to promote the single and released in September 1993. It features M People performing the song in a club. In the beginning, Small is seen arriving the club. At the same time a couple also arrives. Small begins to sing, standing in the crowd of dancing people. The couple then starts arguing and the man begins to dance with another woman from the bar. Small then goes up to her band on the scene and continues singing, while the man's girlfriend starts yelling on him and leaves. He continues dancing with the woman from the bar. A cat appear on the bar counter, being patted by the guests, and a lizard lies by the phone. Suddenly the girlfriend shows up, throwing the content of a glass on her boyfriend and smiling at him. The video ends with M People continuing playing on the scene, while the people are dancing.

Impact and legacy
In 2011, Australian music channel Max included "Moving On Up" in their list of the "1000 Greatest Songs of All Time".

In 2014, Idolator picked it as one of "The 50 Best Pop Singles of 1994". John Hamilton praised it as "a confident pop-soul kiss-off", adding that "its funky sax and Small’s pissed-off vocals combined to create nothing short of a club classic, one that provided ample opportunity for gay and straight clubbers alike to bust a move on dancefloors across the nation."

In 2017, American entertainment company BuzzFeed ranked it number 63 in their list of "The 101 Greatest Dance Songs of the '90s".

Use of the song at the 2022 Conservative Party Conference, to accompany the entrance of Liz Truss, drew strong criticism from the song's writer Mike Pickering, who said the band was "livid". Pickering said that the band had contacted their lawyers but had been advised "there was little that could be done." The song had also been used by Tony Blair and the Labour Party in the 1990s. Pickering said that he hoped Truss took note of the lyrics, as the song was "about, 'go and pack your bags and get out'" and taking a "sip from the devil's cup".

Track listings
 CD maxi
 "Moving On Up" (M People master edit) — 3:34
 "Moving On Up" (M People master mix) — 5:29
 "Moving On Up" (M People dub) — 4:35
 "Moving On Up" (Roger S. gospel revival mix) — 5:55

 12-inch maxi
 "Moving On Up" (M People master mix)
 "Moving On Up" (M People dub)
 "Moving On Up" (Roger S. gospel revival mix)
 "Moving On Up" (Roger S. moving mix)

Charts and certifications

Weekly charts

Year-end charts

Certifications

Other versions
"Moving On Up" was also a dance hit for Belgian singer Roselle in 1995. The chorus is interpolated in the song "Gloves" by Australian comedy group Thanks Pet, Next, a hidden track on their EP Frogstamp, which satirises invasive body searching. In that context, the phrase "moving on up" becomes a double entendre.

In popular culture
"Moving On Up" has been featured in many films, including the British blockbuster The Full Monty, The Next Karate Kid, the American comedies The First Wives Club and Are We Done Yet? and Danny Boyle's psychological thriller Trance. In February 1998, the song was featured in an episode of Top Gear, during the reviews of the Citroën Xantia, Vauxhall Vectra, Peugeot 406, Subaru Legacy and the Volkswagen Passat, with a voice over by presenter Jeremy Clarkson.

References

External links
 Music video by M People performing Moving On Up.YouTube, 1993, Sony BMG MUSIC ENTERTAINMENT.

1993 songs
1993 singles
Deconstruction Records singles
M People songs
Music Week number-one dance singles
Nu-disco songs
Songs written by Mike Pickering
Songs written by Paul Heard
Political party songs
Liz Truss